Wanda Elizabeth "Beth" Moore (born Wanda Elizabeth Green, June 16, 1957) is an American Anglican evangelist, author, and Bible teacher. She is president of Living Proof Ministries, a Christian organization she founded in 1994 to teach women to know and love Jesus through the study of Scripture. Living Proof Ministries is based in Houston, Texas. Moore is "arguably the most prominent white evangelical woman in America," speaks at arena events and has sold millions of books.

The ministry, in conjunction with LifeWay Christian Resources, conducted more than a dozen conferences, known as "Living Proof Live", around the United States annually. Travis Cottrell lead worship at the conferences. From 2007 to 2011, Moore, Kay Arthur, and Priscilla Shirer collaborated on a LifeWay weekend conference, "Deeper Still: The Event". Moore teaches through her radio show, Living Proof with Beth Moore, and on her YouTube channel of the same name. 

Moore writes books and produces video resources based on the Bible studies that she conducts at the Living Proof Live conferences.

She has taught at conferences for women Ireland, England, Singapore, the Philippines, Puerto Rico, and India.

She and husband, Keith, joined the Anglican Church in North America in 2021.

Early life and education
Born in Green Bay, Wisconsin, and raised in Arkadelphia, Arkansas, where her father owned a cinema house, Moore is the fourth of five children, all of whom worked at the cinema from a young age.

Moore was raised in the Southern Baptist Church, regularly attending three times a week. Church was a safe place for Moore as she was growing up, and was the place where she could escape the sexual abuse she experienced at home.

Moore holds a degree in political science from Southwest Texas State University, where she pledged and was initiated into Chi Omega.

Personal life
Moore and husband, Keith, married in 1978. Keith came from a Catholic family and continued his father's plumbing business. They have two daughters, Amanda and Melissa. Both daughters, along with son-in-law Curtis Jones, work with their mother at Living Proof Ministries.

Moore and her husband attend an Anglican Church in Spring, Texas.

Ministry
Moore committed her life to vocational Christian ministry at the age of 18. When she was volunteering as a Sunday school teacher, Moore realized she needed to learn more about the Bible.
She went to a biblical doctrine class that gave her a deep yearning to know the Bible, and she began teaching a weekly Bible study class. By the mid-1990s that class had grown to 2,000 women, and she was speaking at churches throughout South Texas. Although still without any formal theological education, LifeWay Christian Resources' publishing arm Broadman & Holman (later B&H) began publishing her Bible studies in 1994, leading to a national speaking ministry for Moore.
With the help of a worship band she assembled, she began holding weekend conferences around the country. As a base for her national speaking ministry, she founded Living Proof Ministries.

In 2008, she held a simulcast of her "Living Proof Live" that is estimated to have been watched by 70,000 people at 715 locations. The sales of her book about Esther were credited as part of what made a "strong" quarter for Lifeway Christian Stores during the height of the Great Recession.

Moore claimed to support the Southern Baptist Convention’s  complementarian theology which teaches that males and females have complementary roles and does not allow women to be pastors. Male SBC church leaders criticized her for speaking repeatedly on Sundays, which was in contradiction to their understanding of the Bible's position on the role of women in regards to teaching.

Leaving the Southern Baptist Convention
Moore’s adoption of an egalitarian theological position led to her leaving the Southern Baptist Convention, which takes a complementarian approach. In March 2021, Moore announced that, though still a Baptist, she was no longer identified as a Southern Baptist and had ended her publishing relationship with LifeWay Christian. It was subsequently reported that Moore had joined the Anglican Church in North America. The news, along with photos of Moore vested as an acolyte and lector during an Anglican Eucharistic service, triggered criticism from some Baptist ministers. In response, Bishop Clark Lowenfield of the Anglican Diocese of the Western Gulf Coast posted on Twitter: "As her Bishop, [i]t is an honor to serve God as Beth Moore’s spiritual oversight and covering. She is humble and grace-filled. And we pray for those who have been treating her in unChristianly ways over this past week."

Political and social views

Moore does not identify as liberal, or feminist. She is opposed to abortion.

In August 2020, Moore said, "White supremacy has held tight in much of the church for so long because the racists outlasted the anti racists."

Moore criticized portions of the Evangelical movement that dismissed the moral flaws of politicians accused of sexual abuse, most prominently Donald Trump and Roy Moore (no relation). Moore said in a March 2021 interview that after the October 2016 release of the  Access Hollywood tape, in which Donald Trump was heard making offensive comments about women, she was shocked that fellow evangelicals rallied around Trump, and could not understand how he had become "the banner, the poster child for the great white hope of evangelicalism, the salvation of the church in America." In December 2020 she tweeted, "I'm 63 1/2 years old & I have never seen anything in these United States of America I found more astonishingly seductive & dangerous to the saints of God than Trumpism. This Christian nationalism is not of God. Move back from it."

Sexual abuse
Moore was a victim of childhood sexual abuse within her home. After the #MeToo movement and a report in her local newspaper which described 700 cases of sexual abuse within the Southern Baptist Convention, she became an advocate for sexual abuse survivors: sharing her story, listening to other survivors, and urging the church to examine crimes and coverups.  She called out male church leaders for objectifying women and dismissing sexual abuse claims.

Works
When Godly People Do Ungodly Things – book (2002), 
Believing God – book (2004), 
Who Will You Trust? – audio/video series (2007)
Get Out Of That Pit – book (2007), 
Songs of Deliverance – CD (2006)
Fully Alive: Audio/video series with Beth Moore, James and Betty Robison (2006)
So Long Insecurity: You've Been a Bad Friend to Us – book (2010), 
Get Out of That Pit: Straight Talk about God's Deliverance book (2017) 
The Undoing of Saint Silvanus book (2017) 
 All My Knotted-Up Life: A Memoir book (2023)

Bible studies
To Live is Christ: The Life & Ministry of Paul (1997), 
Living Beyond Yourself: Exploring the Fruit of the Spirit (1998), 
Breaking Free (1999)
Jesus: The One and Only (2002), 
When Godly People Do Ungodly Things: Arming Yourself in the Age of Seduction (2002), 
The Beloved Disciple: Following John to the Heart of Jesus (2003), 
Believing God (2004), 
The Patriarchs: Encountering the God of Abraham, Isaac, and Jacob (2005), 
Daniel: Lives of Integrity, words of prophecy (2006), 
A Woman's Heart: God's Dwelling Place (2007)
Stepping Up: Psalms of Ascent (2007), 
Esther: It's Tough Being a Woman (2008), 
Here and Now – There and Then: A Lecture Series on Revelation (2009)
David: Seeking a Heart Like His (2010), 
James: Mercy Triumphs (2011), 
Children of the Day: 1 & 2 Thessalonians (2014), 
Living Free: Learning to Pray God's Word (2015), 
Entrusted - Bible Study Book: A Study of 2 Timothy (2016), 
The Quest: An Excursion Toward Intimacy with God (2017),
Delivered: Experiencing God's Power in Your Pain (2019) 
Chasing Vines: Finding Your Way to an Immensely Fruitful Life (2020)

References

Further reading
 Why Women Want Moore | Christianity Today
 Beth Moore event at Van Andel Arena draws crowd of 7,300 | MLive.com
 Beth Moore wants women to live with dignity – Houston Chronicle
 Christian speaker Beth Moore draws a crowd to PCCC. State Journal-Register.

1957 births
Living people
Writers from Green Bay, Wisconsin
People from Houston
Texas State University alumni
Baptists from Arkansas
Baptists from Texas
American evangelicals
American evangelists
Women evangelists
American Anglican Church in North America members
Converts to Anglicanism from Baptist denominations
Writers from Arkansas
Writers from Louisiana
Writers from Texas